Samerpak Srinon is a professional footballer from Thailand. He is currently playing for Krabi in Thai League 2 as a left-back.

External links
 

1991 births
Living people
Samerpak Srinon
Association football defenders
Samerpak Srinon
Samerpak Srinon
Samerpak Srinon
Samerpak Srinon
Samerpak Srinon
Samerpak Srinon
Samerpak Srinon
Samerpak Srinon